Village Survival, The Eight is a South Korean variety show. The first season aired on SBS TV from November 6 to December 21, 2018. The second season aired from February 15 to March 22, 2019.

Airtime

Format
Eight people are given hint items and 24 hours to solve a mystery in the fictional village of Michuri with Yoo Jae-suk as village head. The reward is worth ₩10 million. The first season was shot in Cheongun-myeon, Yangpyeong County, Gyeonggi Province. The second season was shot in Seo-myeon, Seocheon County, South Chungcheong Province. The duration of each filming session is 2 days and 1 night.

Cast members will acquire additional hint items as they play team games. During preparation of meals (lunch and dinner) and before the end of the first day, the cast members may search the village using the hint items acquired.

Rules
Cast members may not steal another cast member's hint item. Doing so will result in being removed from the show.
The cast member(s) who found the money must inform Yoo Jae-suk before the end of the show.

Season 1
The cast member who found the money has the option of either taking the ₩10 million, or carry the money over onto the next round to try to earn ₩20 million.
If the cast member who found the money decided to keep the ₩10 million, then everyone will vote on who they believe took the money.
If the majority correctly votes for the person who took the money, the ₩10 million goes back to the production team. (or to charity, if it is the season finale.)
If the majority fails to vote for the right person, the cast member who found the money gets to keep it.
If the cast member who found the money decided to carry the money over onto the next round, he or she will decide on new hiding location for the money. The other cast members must look for the money in the new location while the cast member who hid the money must try and prevent the others from finding it.
If nobody found the money, a vote is held for who they think hid the money. Succeeding will deny the cast member the money, and failing will allow the cast member to keep the ₩20 million.
If someone did found the money, the cast member who hid the money earlier will not receive anything. The cast members will then vote on who did take the money that round.

Season 2
In season 2, the format was changed. Instead of the money being hid by the production team, a cast member will randomly receive a "red ball". They will be in charge of hiding the money and preventing the other cast members from finding it. In addition, more than one cast member can find the money and split the prize between them. Any of the cast members who found the money will be allowed to keep their share if they succeed in not getting the majority of votes.

Cast

List of episodes

Season 1

Season 2

Ratings
In the tables below,  represent the lowest ratings and  represent the highest ratings.

Season 1

Season 2

Awards and nominations

References

External links
 
 

2018 South Korean television series debuts
2019 South Korean television series endings
Korean-language television shows
Seoul Broadcasting System original programming
South Korean variety television shows